Merlin and the War of the Dragons is a 2008 fantasy film produced by The Asylum, based loosely on the legends of King Arthur. It was filmed entirely on location in Wales.

Plot
In Pre-England Britain, before the birth of King Arthur, Merlin (Simon Lloyd Roberts) serves under King Vortigern (Hefin Wyn).

Soon after Vortigern's coronation, fire-breathing dragons land in Britain, setting fire to buildings and eating its inhabitants. The dragons threaten the existence of Britain, and Vortigern instructs Merlin to lead an army against the dragons, ordering his best generals, Hengist (Iago McGuire) and Uther (Dylan Jones) to aid Merlin.

Merlin plots to defeat the dragons and defeats them using magic/knowledge.

Cast 
Nia Ann - Lady Nimue
Ceri Bostock - Gwyneth
Carys Eleri - Lady Vivianne
Ruthie Gwilym - Midwife
William Huw - Torm
Dylan Jones - Uther
Iago McGuire - Hengist
Jürgen Prochnow - The Mage
Simon Lloyd Roberts - Merlin
Joseph Stacey - Vendiger
Iona Thonger - Ingraine
Hefin Wyn - Vortigern

See also 
Merlin – A BBC television series premiering in the same year, which also tells of Merlin's early years

References

External links 
 Merlin and the War of the Dragons  at The Asylum
 

2008 films
2000s fantasy adventure films
2008 independent films
American fantasy adventure films
Arthurian films
The Asylum films
British fantasy adventure films
Films about dragons
Films set in England
Films shot in Wales
Works based on Merlin
British independent films
Films directed by Mark Atkins
2000s English-language films
2000s American films
2000s British films